Rok Rogelj (born 12 May 1987 in Ljubljana) is a Slovene snowboarder. He placed 24th in the men's snowboard cross event at the 2010 Winter Olympics.

References

1987 births
Living people
Sportspeople from Ljubljana
Slovenian male snowboarders
Olympic snowboarders of Slovenia
Snowboarders at the 2010 Winter Olympics